Plaisance is an administrative district of Seychelles located on the island of Mahé.

See also
Bernard Adonis

References

Districts of Seychelles
Victoria, Seychelles